Pygmaepterys funafutiensis is a species of sea snail, a marine gastropod mollusk in the family Muricidae, the murex snails or rock snails.

Description

Distribution
This marine species occurs off Tuvalu.

References

External links
 Hedley C. (1899). The Mollusca of Funafuti. Part I - Gasteropoda. Memoirs of the Australian Museum. 3(7): 395-488, pl. 27
 D'Attilio A. & Myers B.W. (1985). A new species of Pygmaepterys Vokes from the western Pacific (Gastropoda: Muricidae). The Nautilus. 99(1): 9-13

Muricidae
Gastropods described in 1899